Au Sable River or variants may refer to:

Canada 
Ausable River (Lake Huron), Ontario
Aux Sables River (Spanish River), Ontario
Rivière aux Sables (Saguenay River), in Saguenay-Lac-Saint-Jean, Quebec

United States 
Au Sable River (Michigan)
Ausable River (New York), also known as "AuSable River"

See also 
 Sauble River (disambiguation)
 Au Sable (disambiguation)